The Globe GC-1 Swift, also known as the Globe/Temco Swift, is a light, two-seat sport monoplane from the post-World War II period.

Design and development
The Swift was designed by R.S. "Pop" Johnson in 1940, despite the fanciful story which has now entered into popular mythology surrounding the Swift's origin (that a Culver Cadet was obtained as a "template" aircraft). The design was financially secured by John Kennedy, president of the Globe Medicine Company, to be built by his new Globe Aircraft Company. World War II interrupted their plans, however, and the  GC-1A Swift advertised as the "All Metal Swift" re-designed by K.H."Bud" Knox, received its type certificate on 7 May 1946. Two prototypes were built but essentially, the design remained the same as the type entered production.  Globe built about 408 GC-1As.

Globe, together with TEMCO, built 833 GC-1Bs in six months. Globe's production outpaced sales of the Swift; as a result Globe was forced into insolvency. TEMCO, the largest creditor, paid $328,000 to obtain the type certificate, tooling, aircraft, and parts allowing them to continue production in late 1947 hoping to recoup their losses. TEMCO built 260 more aircraft before ending Swift production in 1951.

The type certificate for the Swift was obtained by Universal Aircraft Industries (later Univair) along with all production tooling. Spare parts continued to be built until 1979 when the Swift Museum Foundation under the leadership of President Charlie Nelson purchased the Type Certificate, parts and tooling.

Operational history
The most unusual variant of the series became a separate design, the TEMCO TE-1 Buckaroo which was built in a short-run first as a contender for a USAF trainer aircraft contract, and was later transferred to foreign service as a military trainer. Several of these trainers have since returned to the civil market.

Specifications (GC-1B)

See also

References
Notes

Bibliography

 
 Davisson, Budd. "Swiftly, Swiftly: An Appreciation of one of General Aviation's Classic Aircraft." Air Progress, Vol. 45, No. 8, August 1983.
 Lert, Peter. "In The Air: Used Singles Guide." Air Progress, Vol. 48, No. 7, July 1986.

External links

The Swift Museum Foundation - holder of the aircraft Type Certificate
Specs & Photo at flugzeuginfo.net
Globe Swift photos at biplanes.de

1940s United States civil utility aircraft
Low-wing aircraft
Single-engined tractor aircraft
Swift
Swift
Aircraft first flown in 1942